SlideShare is an American hosting service, now owned by Scribd, for professional content including presentations, infographics, documents, and videos. Users can upload files privately or publicly in PowerPoint, Word, PDF, or OpenDocument format. Content can then be viewed on the site itself, on mobile devices or embedded on other sites. SlideShare also provides users the ability to rate, comment on, and share the uploaded content. Launched on October 4, 2006, the service positioned itself to be similar to YouTube, but for presentations. The company was acquired by LinkedIn in 2012, and then by Scribd in 2020.

In 2018, it was estimated that the website gets an estimated 80 million unique visitors a month. SlideShare's biggest competitors include Zoho.com, Issuu and edocr.

History
SlideShare was officially launched on October 4, 2006. Rashmi Sinha, the CEO and co-founder of SlideShare was named amongst the world's Top 10 Women Influencers in Web 2.0 by FastCompany. Jonathan Boutelle  was the CTO of SlideShare and came up with the initial idea behind the website. He wrote the first version of the site.

The website was originally meant to be used for businesses to share slides, but it expanded to become a host of many slides that are uploaded merely to entertain.

On May 3, 2012, SlideShare announced that it was to be acquired by LinkedIn. It is reported that the deal was $118.75 million.

On August 11, 2020, it was reported that Scribd, Inc. acquired Slideshare from LinkedIn for an undisclosed amount. Scribd took over the operations on September 24, 2020.

Slidecast 

On July 24, 2007, Slideshare introduced a format called "SlideCast" 

to "make web multimedia using only a ppt file and an mp3".
According to Boutelle, the word slidecast is a portmanteau of "Slide show" and "podcasting".

Slidecasts allowed users with uploaded PowerPoint, Keynote or PDF presentations to synchronize them to mp3 audio. The audio synchronization process could be started using the editor's "Edit slidecast" link.

On February 7, 2014, less than a year after its acquisition by LinkedIn Corporation, Slideshare announced that Slidecast will be shut down on April 30, 2014.

Zipcasts
In February 2011 SlideShare added a feature called Zipcasts. A Zipcast was a social web conferencing system that allows presenters to broadcast an audio/video feed while driving the presentation through the Internet. Zipcasts also allowed users to communicate during the presentation via an inbuilt chat function.

See also
 Slidecasting

References

External links 
 

LinkedIn
Internet technology companies of the United States
Presentation software
Multilingual websites
Internet properties established in 2006
2012 mergers and acquisitions
2020 mergers and acquisitions